The first season of the Portuguese reality talent show A Voz de Portugal (The Voice Portugal) premiered on October 29, 2011 on RTP1. The coaching panel consisted in singer-songwriter Paulo Gonzo, rock duo Anjos, YouTube sensation Mia Rose and GNR lead vocalist Rui Reininho. Catarina Furtado was the show host, and Diogo Beja was the season's backstage host, also known as Repórter V.

Teams
Color key

  Winner
  Runner-up
  Third place
  Fourth place
  Eliminated in Live shows
  Eliminated in Battles

Blind Auditions 
Color key
 Coach hit his or her "I WANT YOU" button
 Contestant defaulted to this coach's team
 Contestant elected to join this coach's team
 Contestant eliminated with no coach pressing his or her "I WANT YOU" button

Episode 1 (29 October 2011) 

 Mia pressed Rui's button.

Episode 2 (5 November)

Episode 3 (12 November)

Episode 4 (19 November)

Episode 5 (26 November)

Episode 6 (3 December)

Battles 
Coaches begin narrowing down their teams by training the contestants with the help of "trusted advisors". Each episode featured seven battles and each battle concluding with the respective coach selecting one winner out of the two or three contestants; the seven winners for each coach advanced to the live shows. In a special wildcard round the coach had to choose two of his team that lost in the battle round of which the public would vote for one to advance to the live shows as the final contestant.

Color key
 Battle winner
 Battle loser
 Selected for the Wildcard

Wildcard 
Each coach had the chance to nominate two of the battle losers from their team to have another chance of going to the live shows. The outcome was decided by televote.

Color key
 Wildcard winner

Live Shows

Results table

Color Key

Team Paulo

Team Anjos

Team Mia

Team Rui

References

2011 Portuguese television seasons
2012 Portuguese television seasons
The Voice Portugal